Cheshire is a former United Kingdom parliamentary constituency for the county of Cheshire. It was a constituency of the House of Commons of the Parliament of England then of the Parliament of Great Britain from 1707 to 1800 and of the Parliament of the United Kingdom from 1801 to 1832.

As a county palatine it was unrepresented in the Parliament until the Chester and Cheshire (Constituencies) Act 1542 (34 & 35 Hen VIII. c. 13).  Cheshire was represented by two Knights of the Shire from 1545, with only County Durham out of the English counties being left unrepresented after that.

It was divided between the constituencies of North Cheshire and South Cheshire in 1832.

Members of Parliament

1545–1659
 Constituency created (1545)

 Four members returned to First Protectorate Parliament (1654)

1659–1832
 Two members returned to Third Protectorate Parliament (1659)

Constituency abolished (1832)

See also
List of former United Kingdom Parliament constituencies
Unreformed House of Commons
History of parliamentary constituencies and boundaries in Cheshire

References
Cheshire Gentry

Parliamentary constituencies in Cheshire (historic)
Constituencies of the Parliament of the United Kingdom established in 1545
Constituencies of the Parliament of the United Kingdom disestablished in 1832